Paul Wettlaufer (born January 28, 1978 in Calgary, Alberta) is a field hockey player from Canada.

Wettlaufer earned his first international cap for the Men's National Team in 1998 against Spain in Barcelona.
Paul grew up in the District of North Vancouver, British Columbia, where he attended Handsworth Secondary School (1991–1996) and played field hockey for the West Vancouver Field Hockey Club.

International senior competitions
 1998 – Commonwealth Games, Kuala Lumpur (not ranked)
 1999 – Sultan Azlan Shah Tournament, Kuala Lumpur (4th)
 1999 – Pan American Games, Winnipeg (1st)
 2000 – Sultan Azlan Shah Tournament, Kuala Lumpur (7th)
 2000 – Americas Cup, Cuba (2nd)
 2000 – Olympic Games, Sydney (10th)
 2001 – World Cup Qualifier, Edinburgh (8th)
 2002 – Commonwealth Games, Manchester (6th)
 2003 – Pan American Games, Santo Domingo (2nd)
 2004 – Olympic Qualifying Tournament, Madrid (11th)
 2004 – Pan Am Cup, London (2nd)
 2006 – Commonwealth Games, Melbourne (9th)
 2006 – World Cup Qualifier, Changzhou (10th)
 2007 – Pan American Games, Rio de Janeiro, Brazil (1st)
 2008 – Olympic Games, Beijing (10th)

References
 Profile

External links

1978 births
Living people
Sportspeople from British Columbia
Canadian male field hockey players
Canadian people of German descent
Field hockey players at the 1998 Commonwealth Games
Field hockey players at the 2000 Summer Olympics
Field hockey players at the 2002 Commonwealth Games
Field hockey players at the 2006 Commonwealth Games
Field hockey players at the 2008 Summer Olympics
Olympic field hockey players of Canada
Sportspeople from Calgary
People from North Vancouver
Pan American Games gold medalists for Canada
Pan American Games silver medalists for Canada
Pan American Games medalists in field hockey
West Vancouver Field Hockey Club players
Field hockey players at the 1999 Pan American Games
Field hockey players at the 2003 Pan American Games
Field hockey players at the 2007 Pan American Games
Medalists at the 2007 Pan American Games
Commonwealth Games competitors for Canada
2010 Men's Hockey World Cup players